

C
 
 
 
 
 
 SSV C-Champion
 SSV C-Commando
 
 
 

Cab–Can 

 
 
  (/)
 
 
  (//)
  (/)
 
 
  (/)
 
 
 
 
 
 
 
  (/)
  (USCGC///)
  (/)
  (/)
 
 
 
 
  (/)
 
 
 
  (/)
 
 
 
 
 
 
  (/)
 
 
 
  (/)
  (/)
  (/)
 
 
 
 
  (SP-2274, /)
  (/)
  (/)
 
  (/)
  (/)
 
  (//)
 
 
  (USLHT Camellia)
 
 
  (/)
 
 
 
 
  (/)
  (//)
 
  (/)
  (//)
  (/)
  (/)
 
 
 
 
  (/)
  (/)
 
  (/, /)
  (/)
  (/)
 
  (/)

Cap

 
  (//)
 
 
 
 
 
 
 
 
 
 
 
 
 
 
 
 
 
 
 
 
 
 
 
 
 
 
 
 
 
 
  (/)
 
  
 
  
 
 
  (//)
 
 
 
 
 
 
 
 
 
 
 
 
 
 
 
 
 
 
 
 
  (/)
 
 
 
 
 
 
 
 
 
 
 
 
 
 
  (/)
 
 
  (/)
  (/)
 
 
  (/)
 
 
 
 
  (//)
 

Car–Cay 

 
  (/)
  (//)
  (/)
  (//////)
  (/)
 
 
  (/)
 
 
 
 
 
 
 
 
 
 
 
  (/)
 
 
  (//)
 
 
 
 
 
 
 
 
 
 
 
 
  (//)
  (/)
  (//)
 
  (/)
 
 
 
  (/)
  (/, /)
 
  (/)
 
 
 
  (/)
 
  (//)
 
 
 
  (/)
 
 
 
 
 
 
 
 
  (//)
 
 
 
 
  (/)
 
 
  (/)
  (/)
  (/)
 
 
 
 
 
 
  (///)
  (//)
 
  (/)
  (//)
  (/)
 
 

Ce

 
 
 
 
  (/)
 
 
 
 
 
  (/)
 
  (/)
 
 
 
 
 

Cha 

 
 
  
 
 
 
  (/)
 USS Chalcedony
  (///)
 
  (//)
 
  (/)
 
  (/)
 
 
  (//, /)
 
  (//)
 
  (/)
 
  (/)
  (//)
 
 
 
 
 
  
  (/)
 
 
  (/)
 
 
 
 
 
  (/)
 
  (/)
 
 
 
 
 
 
 
 
  (/, /)
 
  (/)
  (/)
 
 
 
  (//)
 
 
  (/)
  (/)
  (/)
  (/)
 
 
  (//)
  (/)
  (/)
  (//, /)
  (/)
 
 
 
  (/)

Che–Chu 

 
 
  (/)
  (/)
  (//)
 
 
  (/)
  (////)
 
  (/)
  (//)
 
  (///)
 
 
 
  (/)
  (/)
 
 
  (/)
 
  (/)
 
  (/)
 
 
  (/)
  (/)
  (/, /, /)
 
  (/)
  (/)
 
 
  (//)
 
 
  (/)
 
  (//)
 
  (/)
  (USCGC)
  (//)
  (///)
 
 
  (/)
 
  (/)
  (/)
 
  (//)
 
 
  (/)
 
 
  (/)
  (/)
 
 
 
 
 
  (/)
  (/)
  (/)
 
  (/)
  (/)
  (//)
  (/)
 
 
 
 
  (/)
 
  (/)
  (/)
 
 
 
  (/)
 
 

Ci
 
 
 
  (/)
 
 
  (/)
 
 
 
 
 
 
 
 
 

Cl

 
 
  (//)
 
 
 
 
 
 
  (/)
 
  (/)
 
 
 
 
 
 
 
 
  (/)
 
 
 
 
 
  (///)
 
 
  (//)
  (/)
 
 
 
  (//)
  (/)
 
 
 
 
 

Coa–Com 

 
 
 
  (ORV-16//)
 
  (/)
  (/)
  (//)
 
  (/)
 
  (//)
 
  (/)
 
 
  (//)
 
 
 
  (/)
  (//)
 
 
 
  (/)
 
 
 
 
  (/)
  (//)
 
 
  (/)
 
  (/)
  (/)
  (/) 
  (/)
 
 
  (/)
 
 
 
 
 
 
 
  (/, /)
 
  (/)
 
 
 
 
  (//)
 
 
 
  (//)
 
 
 
 
 
 
 
 
 
 
 
 
  (//)
  (/)
 
 
 
 

Con–Coq 

 
 
  (/)
 
  (//)
  (/)
  (/)
 
  (/)
 
  (/)
 
 
  (/)
 
  (/)
 
 
 
 
 
 
  (//)
  (/)
 
  (/)
 
 
  (/)
 
 
 
 
  (/)
 
  (/, /)
 
 
 
 
 
  (//)
 
 
  (/)
  (/)
 
  (/, /)
  (//)
 
 
  (//)
 
 
  (//)
  (///)
 
 
 

Cor–Cp 

 
 
  (/, //)
  (/)
  (/)
 
  (//)
 
  (/////)
 
 
  (/)
  (//, /)
  (/)
 
 
 
  (/, //)
 
 
 
 
 
  (/)
 
  (//)
  (/)
  (/)
 
 
 
 
 
 
 
 
  (//)
 
  (/)
 
 
 
 
  (/)
 
  (//)
 
 
 
  (/)
  (/)
 
 
 
  (/)
  (//)
 
  (/)
  (//)
 
 
 
 

Cr

  (/)
 
 
 
 
 
 
 
 
 
  (/)
 
  (/)
 
  (/)
 
 
  (/)
 
 
  (/)
 
 
 
 
  (///)
  (//, /////)
  (/)
 
 
 
  (/)
 
  (/)
  (/)
 
  (/)
 
  (/)
 
 
 
 
  (/)
 
 
 

Cu–Cy 

 
 
 
 
 
 
  (/)
 
 
 
  (/)
 
  (/, /)
 
 
 
 
 
 
 
 
 
  (/)
 
  (//)
  (//)
  (/)
 
 
  (/)
  (//)
 
  (/)
 
  (/)
 
 
 
 
 
  (/)

References

Primary
 Dictionary of American Naval Fighting Ships, C
  Naval Vessel Register, C

Secondary
 navy.mil: List of homeports and their ships
NavSource Naval History